Mary Miller Allan (1869 – 1947) was a British academic. From 1903 to 1935, she was Principal of Homerton College, Cambridge.

Biography 
Allan was born and raised in Glasgow, and educated at the University of St Andrews, graduating with a "Lady Literate in Arts" (LLA) degree in 1894 (before women were allowed to earn standard degrees at the university). She became principal of Homerton College, Cambridge in 1903. She appointed female lecturers, and became the first female president of the Training College Association in 1916. She retired from Homerton in 1935.

Death
Mary Miller Allan died in 1947. There is a Mary Allan Building at Cambridge, named in her memory. A 1919 portrait of Allan, by Hugh Goldwin Rivière, is in the college's collection.

References

1869 births
1956 deaths
Academics from Glasgow
Alumni of the University of St Andrews
Principals of Homerton College, Cambridge
Educational administrators
Date of birth missing
Date of death missing